Pavel Královec (born 16 August 1977) is a Czech football referee. He has been a full international for FIFA since 2005.

Career
He was selected on the list of referees for the 2011 FIFA U-17 World Cup in Mexico and the 2012 Olympic tournament. He has also officiated in 2010 and 2014 World Cup qualifiers, as well as qualifying matches for Euro 2008 and Euro 2012.

In March 2013, FIFA named Královec to its list of 52 candidate referees for the 2014 FIFA World Cup in Brazil.

Career statistics
Statistics for Gambrinus liga matches only.

References

External links
Pavel Královec on WorldReferee.com
Pavel Královec on rozhodci-cmfs.cz 
Pavel Královec on weltfussball.de 

1977 births
Living people
Czech football referees
Olympic football referees
Football referees at the 2012 Summer Olympics
UEFA Euro 2016 referees
People from Domažlice
Sportspeople from the Plzeň Region